The Play-offs of the 2010 Fed Cup Americas Zone Group II were the final stages of the Group II Zonal Competition involving teams from the Americas. Using the positions determined in their pools, the ten teams faced off to determine their placing in the 2010 Fed Cup Americas Zone Group II. The top two teams advanced to Group I for the next year.

Promotion play-offs
The first and second placed teams of each pool were placed against each other in two head-to-head rounds. The winner of the rounds advanced to Group I for 2011.

Ecuador vs. Mexico

Bahamas vs. Peru

Fifth to Sixth play-offs
The third-placed teams from each pool were drawn in head-to-head rounds to find the fifth and sixth placed teams.

Costa Rica vs. Guatemala

Seventh to Eighth play-offs
The fourth-placed teams from each pool were drawn in head-to-head rounds to find the seventh and eighth placed teams.

Trinidad and Tobago vs. Bermuda

Ninth and Tenth play-offs
The fifth-placed teams from each pool were drawn in head-to-head rounds to find the ninth and tenth placed teams.

Dominican Republic vs. Panama

Final placements

  and  advanced to 2010 Fed Cup Americas Zone Group I. The Peruvians placed fourth overall, while the Mexicans placed last and thus were relegated back to Group II for 2012.

See also
 Fed Cup structure

References

External links
 Fed Cup website

2010 Fed Cup Americas Zone